The  was a denomination of Japanese yen issued from 1951 to 1994 in paper form. Crudely made notes were first made in an unsuccessful attempt to curb inflation at the time, and the series as a whole is broken down into three different types of note. Only the last two have a known design which feature Iwakura Tomomi on the obverse, and Mount Fuji on the reverse. Starting in 1982, new 500 yen coins began to be minted which eventually replaced their paper counterparts. While the production of 500 yen notes continued until 1984, all of the notes issued were officially withdrawn from circulation in 1994. Five hundred yen notes were allowed to retain their legal tender status, but they are now worth more on the collector's market than at face value.

Series
The first series of 500 yen notes (called "series B") were released on April 2, 1951 with improved security features such as Watermarks. This time these new notes appeared to have been more successful, as they were issued for almost 20 years until finally being withdrawn on January 4, 1971. The final 500 yen notes are referred to as "series C" notes, and were issued starting on November 1, 1969 with new watermarks to enhance security. The issue came to an end on April 1, 1994 when 500 yen notes were withdrawn from circulation.

Gallery

See also         
Banknotes of the Japanese yen
500 euro note
Hong Kong five hundred-dollar note
Indian 500-rupee note
Large denominations of United States currency
Philippine five hundred peso note

References

Japanese yen banknotes
Five-hundred-base-unit banknotes